Enid Mary Chadwick (1902–1987) was a British artist known for religious art and children's religious material.

Enid Chadwick lived in Walsingham for more than fifty years. She came to Walsingham from Brighton in 1934. She was the daughter of a priest and attended a convent school in Oxford run by the sisters of the Society of the Holy and Undivided Trinity, whose house is now St Antony's College.

Chadwick trained at the Brighton School of Art prior to coming to Walsingham in 1934. Chadwick's painting and her personal style appear in the Anglican Shrine of Our Lady of Walsingham.

Works

Notes and references

Citations

Bibliography 

1902 births
1987 deaths
20th-century British women artists
Religious artists
British Anglo-Catholics
Artists from Brighton
People from Walsingham